Yılmaz Büyükerşen Wax Museum, also known as Eskişehir Wax Museum, is a wax museum in Odunpazarı second level municipality in Greater Eskişehir, Turkey.

It is next to various other museums. It was established on 19 May 2013 by Yılmaz Büyükerşen, sculptor and the mayor of Eskişehir Metropolitan Municipality. The museum revenues are to be used in the education of female students and in general students with disabilities.

There are 198 wax sculptures exhibited in five halls in the museum. The halls are;

Hall A: Atatürk (founder of Turkey) and his family, Turkish War of Independence, some of the Ottoman sultans 
Hall B: Aviation, railroads, press, industry, science, sports, foreign leaders, Turkish actors and other artists 
Hall C: Historical characters 
Hall D: Democracy (in this hall taking photography is not permitted).
Hall E: Yılmaz Büyükerşen's personal exhibition 

Some of the characters depicted are,:
Mehmet II (1432–1481), Selim I (1470/1-1520), Süleyman I (1494–1566), Hürrem Sultan (1502/04-1558), Cengiz Topel (1934–1964), Sabiha Gökçen (1913–2001),  Cüneyt Arkın (born 1937), Orhan Gencebay (born 1944), Hulusi Kentmen (1912–1993), Barış Manço (1943–1999), Kemal Sunal (1944–2000), Yunus Emre (1238–1320), Battal Gazi (690/5-740), Nasrettin Hoca (13th century), İlber Ortaylı (born 1947), Hıfzı Topuz (born 1923), Ataol Behramoğlu (born 1942), Emin Çölaşan (born 1942), Beyazıt Öztürk (born 1969), İlyas Salman (born 1949), Adile Naşit (1930–1987), Adnan Menderes (1899–1961), Turgut Özal (1927–1993).

References

External links
Images

Gallery

Museums in Eskişehir
Tourist attractions in Eskişehir Province
Wax museums
Odunpazarı
Museums established in 2013
2013 establishments in Turkey